Complete through end of 2007 Champ Car season.

For a complete list of winners of all Indy car races, see List of American Championship Car winners.

See also 

 List of Champ Car circuits
 List of Champ Car drivers
 List of fatal Champ Car accidents
 List of Champ Car pole positions
 List of Champ Car teams

Champ Car